Nailed is the first studio album by Place of Skulls. The album was originally recorded under the Man's Ruin label which folded before the album could be released. Guy Pinhas (The Obsessed, Goatsnake) appealed to Greg Anderson for assistance which resulted in the band signing with Southern Lord to distribute the album. 

Bassist Lee Abney left the band soon after the album's release.

Track listing 
All songs written by Victor Griffin, except where noted.

 "The Fall" – 4:38
 "Never Die" – 4:29
 "Dead" – 5:18
 "Don't Let Me Be Misunderstood*" (Benjamin, Caldwell, Marcus) – 4:40
 "Feeling of Dread..." – 2:31
 "..." – 2:20
 "Love She Gave"  – 5:12
 "Return" – 4:34
 "Song of Solomon" – 5:23

 Cover of a song originally written for Nina Simone, but was itself covered by The Animals

Personnel 
 Victor Griffin – vocals and guitar
 Lee Abney – bass
 Tim Tomaselli – drums

References 

2001 debut albums
Place of Skulls (band) albums
Southern Lord Records albums
Albums produced by Travis Wyrick